The Gandhi High School in Pécs, Hungary (in Romani: Gandhi (Mashkarutni Shkola ando Pech)), was founded with donations given by several individuals from the private sector and with further donations from other organizations in 1992, this becoming the first high school for Romani people in Hungary, that has been actively operating since 1994. 
It was named after the Indian Mahatma Gandhi, to emphasize the Indian origin of all Romani groups. 
The purpose of the middle school/high school is to provide a school-leaving exam (A-level), also to improve the prospects of Romani children in Hungary and to help preserving the Romani culture.

The school is financed by the Government of Hungary with additional funds from the EU and by donations. 
The school consists of 6 classrooms where about 250 male and female pupils study, mostly between the ages of 14 to 18. 
There are also courses available for the older generation.
The first group of students beginning in 1994 took their school-leaving exam (A-level) in 2000 and out of 18 pupils, 16 have applied to universities, whilst 7 out of the 18 students gained entry to their desired universities. 
Less than 1% of Romani people in Hungary in Hungary are university graduates. 
Although the school is open to all, currently only five non-Romani are being enrolled to our institution but hopefully this picture will soon change as quality of education is being improved.

See also 
 Roma in Hungary

References

Sources 
 Information in German
 I Mashkarutni Shkola Gandhi (magyarikanes)
 I librariya (pustakalya)

External links 
 YouTube:Working with the Roma People at the Gandhi School

Gymnasiums in Hungary
Organisations based in Pécs
Romani in Hungary
1992 establishments in Hungary
Educational institutions established in 1992